MSM7000 is a series of system-on-a-chip processors manufactured by Qualcomm for handheld devices, especially smartphones.

These SOCs have multiple processing cores but unlike contemporary processor chips like AMD's Athlon/Phenom and Intel's Core series, these multiple cores are not available in the OS to run applications that have symmetric multiprocessing properties.  There is only one core to run the OS and user applications.

Generally these SOCs have the following 4 cores:

 Applications processor, ARM1136J-S, running Windows Mobile /  Android / Linux / etc.
 Applications DSP, QDSP5000, does coding/decoding for media.
 Baseband processor, ARM9, running a real-time OS and the GSM stack
 Baseband DSP, QDSP4000, does coding/decoding for telephony

Apart from the CPU cores the chips contain such hardware as 2D graphics hardware, 3D (OpenGL ES 1.1) graphics hardware, media acceleration hardware (for video decode, etc.), and various interfaces (keyboard, display / MDDI, USB, camera, TV, etc.). They also contain an AXI controller, a kind of memory control unit.

They are widely used in smartphones produced by HTC Corporation (including both Windows Mobile and Android devices), Sony Ericsson, LG Group, Samsung, ZTE, and also other devices like the Zeebo.

MSM7200, MSM7200A, MSM7201, MSM7201A
The A versions have higher specs (frequencies) and a smaller manufacturing process (65 nm vs. 90 nm). The 7x01 versions have a different radio than the 7x00 versions.

Popular phones using these processors:
MSM7200 400 MHz (384 MHz in real) 90 nm; HTC Touch Dual/Touch Cruise, HTC S730, HTC TyTN II
MSM7201 400 MHz 90 nm; Palm Treo Pro, Pharos Traveler 117, Pharos Traveler 127, Zeebo
MSM7200A 528 MHz 65 nm; HTC Magic, HTC Hero GSM, HTC Tilt 2, Motorola CLIQ, Motorola CLIQ XT, Motorola Backflip, Samsung i7500 Galaxy, T-Mobile Pulse UK, Sony Ericsson Xperia X1
MSM7201A 528 MHz 65 nm; HTC Dream, HTC Magic, HTC Diamond, T-Mobile Comet US(Huawei Ideos U8150), HTC Touch Pro

MSM7500, MSM7501, MSM7500A, MSM7501A
Basically the same as the MSM7200, but with CDMA radio replacing the GSM radio.
The A versions have higher specs (frequencies) and a smaller manufacturing process (65 nm vs. 90 nm). The 7x01 versions have a different radio than the 7x00 versions.

MSM7600, MSM7601, MSM7600A, MSM7601A
Same as the MSM7200A, but with both GSM and CDMA functionality, each of which can be optionally disabled.
The A versions have higher specs (frequencies) and a smaller manufacturing process (65 nm vs. 90 nm). The 7x01 versions have a different radio than the 7x00 versions.

Popular phones using these processors:
MSM7600A 528 MHz 65 nm; HTC Hero CDMA, HTC Touch Pro2 - Verizon CDMA specs BlackBerry 8530

MSM7x25
MSM7225 and MSM7625 was later included in the Snapdragon S1 family, see Snapdragon S1

MSM7x27

MSM7227 and MSM7627 was later included in the Snapdragon S1 family, see Snapdragon S1

MSM7x30
MSM7230 and MSM7630 was later included in the Snapdragon S2 family, see Snapdragon S2

References

Embedded microprocessors
Qualcomm
System on a chip